Tokyo Ghoul, as well as the sequel Tokyo Ghoul:re and prequel Tokyo Ghoul: Jack are written and illustrated by Sui Ishida. The light novels are written by Shin Towada and illustrated by Sui Ishida.

Tokyo Ghoul follows the main character Ken Kaneki, his various companions and the CCG. Tokyo Ghoul is completed and consists of 14 tankōbon volumes released between February 17, 2012 and October 17, 2014. Viz Media released the English version from June 16, 2015 to August 15, 2017. Tokyo Ghoul is also being translated into German and French, respectively by Kazé Manga and Glénat.

Tokyo Ghoul:re, the sequel to Tokyo Ghoul, was serialised in Weekly Young Jump from October 16, 2014 to July 5, 2018, and has been released from December 2014 to July 2018 in 16 tankōbon volumes. Viz released the first English volume on October 17, 2017.

Tokyo Ghoul

One-shot
Released March 15, 2011. Features the one-shot chapter of Tokyo Ghoul. It was published by Miracle Jump.

Tokyo Ghoul:re

Side stories

Tokyo Ghoul [JACK]
The prequel to Tokyo Ghoul focusing on Kishou Arima as a teenager. It was digitally published by Jump Live. It can also be read through Amazon Kindle and other Kindle devices

Tokyo Ghoul [ZAKKI]
A book of illustrations of Tokyo Ghoul wallpaper. It contains, among other things, the Tokyo Ghoul tankōbon cover art.

Light novels
All light novels are written by Shin Towada and illustrated by Sui Ishida.

In December 2016, a Tokyo Ghoul:re novel series written by Shin Towada and illustrated by Sui Ishida began publication by Shueisha in JUMP j-BOOKS weekly magazine.

References

External links
  official manga website at Weekly Young Jump 

Tokyo Ghoul
Tokyo Ghoul